Kfar Haim (lit. Haim Village) is a moshav in central Israel. Located in the coastal plain near Netanya, it falls under the jurisdiction of Hefer Valley Regional Council.

History
The moshav was founded on 16 June 1933 by Jewish immigrants from Poland and Russia, and was named after Haim Arlosoroff, who was assassinated on the day it was founded.

References

Moshavim
Populated places established in 1933
1933 establishments in Mandatory Palestine
Populated places in Central District (Israel)
Polish-Jewish culture in Israel
Russian-Jewish culture in Israel